Balezino is a rural locality (a settlement) and the administrative center of Balezinsky District of the Udmurt Republic, Russia. Population:

History
Balezino had work settlement status until it was demoted to a rural locality in March 2012.

Transportation
It is an important station of the Trans-Siberian Railway, situated roughly in the center between Kirov and Perm, and is a junction point of 25 kV AC rail line going to Kirov and 3 kV DC line going to Perm. Long distance trains stop for at least thirty minutes at the Balezino station for maintenance, which includes the engine replacement from AC one to DC one.

References

Rural localities in Udmurtia
Glazovsky Uyezd